Oranje Hein   is a 1936 Dutch film directed by Max Nosseck.

Cast
Herman Bouber	... 	Oranje Hein
Aaf Bouber	... 	Aal
Johan Elsensohn	... 	Thijs van der Spil, fishmonger
Annie Verhulst	... 	Ant van der Spil
Sylvain Poons	... 	Uncle Bram
Fien Berghegge		(as Fientje Berghegge)
Max Croiset		
Harry Boda		
Clara Vischer-Blaaser		(as Clara Vischer)

References

External links 
 

1936 films
Dutch black-and-white films
Films directed by Max Nosseck
Dutch comedy films
1936 comedy films
1930s Dutch-language films